Grand Raggidy Roller Derby is a women's flat track roller derby league based in Grand Rapids, Michigan. Founded in 2005, the league is a founding member of the Women's Flat Track Derby Association (WFTDA).

History
The league was founded as "Grand Raggidy Roller Girls" by Tricia "The Vindicator" Woolfenden and Katy "Shutter Speed" Batdorff in 2005. The first public game for Grand Raggidy was held in April 2006 with over 2,000 fans in attendance at the DeltaPlex Arena. Since as far back as 2009, Grand Raggidy has held its home games at Rivertown Sports, with exceptions in 2013 when the venue was flood-damaged.

Four of the league's skaters appeared as themselves in the movie Whip It!: Dot Matrix, Shutter Speed, Tamara Hurtsworse, and Jackie Daniels, who was recruited after skating for the mixed-league "Team Awesome" in Los Angeles.

In 2015, Grand Raggidy updated its name from "Roller Girls" to "Roller Derby", as part of its tenth anniversary season and recognizing the contributions of its members.

WFTDA competition

The league qualified for the 2007 WFTDA Eastern Regional Tournament; they were seeded eleventh and lost in the first round to Gotham Girls Roller Derby, 206-47. They qualified again the following year, going 1-3 on the weekend and finished in tenth place. In 2009 Grand Raggidy qualified for the newly-created WFTDA North Central Regional Tournament, seeded seventh, but lost all their bouts to finish tenth.

After missing WFTDA Playoffs from 2010–12, Grand Raggdiy qualified for Division 1 Playoffs in 2013, and went 1-2 as the tenth seed in Fort Wayne and finished in ninth place courtesy of a 186-134 victory over Bleeding Heartland. In 2014, Grand Raggidy competed at Division 2 Playoffs in Kitchener-Waterloo, Ontario as the tenth seed and went winless to finish in tenth. Grand Raggidy missed Playoffs in 2015 but returned to Division 2 in 2016 as the tenth seed in Lansing, Michigan, but again went winless and finished in tenth place.

Rankings

References

Sports in Grand Rapids, Michigan
Roller derby leagues established in 2005
Roller derby leagues in Michigan
2005 establishments in Michigan